In Greek Mythology, Antandre (Ancient Greek: Ἀντάνδρη means 'she who precedes men') was an Amazonian warrior. She was one of Penthesilea's twelve companions at Troy.

Mythology 
Antandre was killed in the Trojan War by the hero Achilles, according to Quintus Smyrnaeus's Fall of Troy:
"But Peleus' son [i.e. Achilles] burst on the Amazons smiting Antandre..."

Notes

References

 Quintus Smyrnaeus, The Fall of Troy translated by Way. A. S. Loeb Classical Library Volume 19. London: William Heinemann, 1913. Online version at theio.com
 Quintus Smyrnaeus, The Fall of Troy. Arthur S. Way. London: William Heinemann; New York: G.P. Putnam's Sons. 1913. Greek text available at the Perseus Digital Library

Amazons of the Trojan war